Sera is a company that produces and sells home aquaculture and aquarium products and food for pet fish. The company is based in Heinsberg (North Rhine-Westphalia), Germany.

It was founded in 1970 by Josef Ravnak, a fish food salesman, The name “sera” is a combination of Ravnak's first name: Sepp (nickname for Josef), and his family name: Ravnak.

Shortly after the company's founding; the company began to specialize in a new process called lyophilization, which preserving food animals with optimal retention of their nutrients and vitamins.

Early years
sera vipan flakes, the company's flagship food, was introduced in 1972. The company focus broadened to include the aquarium hobby as a whole and throughout the decade they developed water conditioners, such as sera aqutan and sera morena; aquatic plant fertilizers, such as sera florena; and aquarium fish medications, such as sera costapur and sera baktopur. A series of water testing kits was also developed.

Towards the end of the 1970s, sera turned to the garden pond sector and developed a complete range of pond care products. Turtle and other reptile products were added at this time.

Throughout the 1980s, sera increased its product lines with foods, vitamins, and technological products. During these years  sera Bio-Denitrator was launched, which was the first mechanism to target the biological breakdown of nitrate in an aquarium.

See also 
Fish food

References 

Animal food manufacturers
Fish food brands
Fishkeeping
Companies based in North Rhine-Westphalia
Multinational companies headquartered in Germany
1970 establishments in West Germany
German companies established in 1970